The French film industry produced over four hundred feature films in 2014. This article fully lists all non-pornographic films, including short films, that had a release date in that year and which were at least partly made by France. It does not include films first released in previous years that had release dates in 2014.  Also included is an overview of the major events in French film, including film festivals and awards ceremonies, as well as lists of those films that have been particularly well received, both critically and financially.

Major releases

January – March

April – June

July – September

October – December

Notable deaths

See also 

 2014 in film
 2014 in France
 2014 in French television
 Cinema of France
 List of 2014 box office number-one films in France
 List of French submissions for the Academy Award for Best Foreign Language Film

References

External links 

French films of 2014 at Cinema-francais.fr
 2014 in France
 List of 2014 box office number-one films in France

French
2014
Films